Touch Chesi Chudu  is a 2018 Indian Telugu-language action comedy film written by Vakkantham Vamsi and directed by Vikram Sirikonda in his directorial debut in Telugu cinema. It features Ravi Teja, Raashi Khanna and Seerat Kapoor in the lead roles while Freddy Daruwala plays the main antagonist, which marks his debut in Telugu cinema. Pre-production of the film began in July 2016 and principal photography commenced in February 2017 in Hyderabad. The film released worldwide on 2 February 2018.

Plot
Karthikeya (Ravi Teja) is an owner of Kartikeya Industries in Pondicherry. He looks after his family very well. His philosophy is "family is most important". Karthik and his family live in Pondicherry. There is a goon named Selvam who robs Karthik's machinery often. Karthik's repeated complaints fall on deaf ears. He challenges that he can solve the case in two minutes, so the CI makes him CI for one day to fight Selvam. Meanwhile, Karthik falls in love with a choreographer named Pushpa (Raashi Khanna) after a few silly talks and fights.

One day after Irfan Lala (Freddy Daruwala) kills a student activist in a pub, Karthik's sister secretly watches it. She tells it to her brother. Karthik informs this to the police based on the picture of the criminal. The police officer Ramachandra Rao (Sayaji Shinde) scolds Karthik that the criminal died long back ago. On the road, Karthik suddenly watches Irfan going on the road. He chases after Irfan but misses him, so he calls the Police Commissioner (Murali Sharma) in Hyderabad and asks for Irfan. A flashback is then revealed.

Karthik is actually a dangerous, reckless, zero family emotions, and the duty-dedicated cop who gets transferred from Kadapa to Hyderabad. He goes on a mission to save the daughter of the commissioner, who is threatened by a gang to release their leader. Karthik goes and kills all of them and retrieves the commissioner's daughter safely.

Irfan Lala and his father Rauf Lala (Shahbaz Khan) are two goons hoping to win a by-election so that Irfan can become an MLA. Irfan does not let the CM of the state for rallying in his area called Muzaffarpet. Karthik tactically secures the CM's rally and makes it successful, and the voting is also successful. Meanwhile, Divya (Seerat Kapoor) loves Karthik a lot. Her parents fix the engagement, but Karthik breaks it due to an important mission. Divya gets hurt and leaves him forever.

During a party in an altercation, Irfan kills Shalini (Kaumudi Nemani). Her mother (Suhasini Maniratnam) goes on a hunger strike in order to get justice. It is revealed that Karthik was once the student of Shalini's mother. He promises to take action and urges her to break the fast. During a shootout, he fatally wounds Irfan and himself becomes injured.

In the hospital, Karthik frantically searches for Irfan; however, Karthik's father (Jayaprakash) cools him down by saying that Irfan is already dead. This is actually a drama played by both Karthik's father and the commissioner so that Karthik would be close to his family. Listening to all of this, Karthik decides to draw a balance between professional and personal life. He returns and kills Irfan in a cool manner. Upon knowing this, Rauf dies. The film ends with Karthik meeting Pushpa and requesting her to forgive him. They both affectionately hug each other.

Cast

Production

Development 
Pre-production of this film began in July 2016 after the script approval from Ravi Teja to Vikram Sirikonda. Raashi Khanna who earlier worked with Teja in Bengal Tiger (2015) was signed in as one of the female lead in September 2016.

Pritam was roped in for the music which makes his debut in Telugu cinema. Bollywood actor Freddy Daruwala was signed in to play as the main antagonist in April 2017 which marks his debut in Telugu films. Seerat Kapoor was signed in as the second female lead in early May 2017 after considering Lavanya Tripathi and Pragya Jaiswal for that role.

The title and the posters were revealed on 26 January 2017, marking Ravi Teja's birthday. The film was officially launched on 3 February 2017.

Story and filming 
Principal photography began on 3 February 2017 in Hyderabad.

Soundtrack 

Touch Chesi Chudu's soundtrack is composed by JAM8 (Apprentice band of Pritam).

Reception 
A critic from The Times Of India stated that " If you're a Ravi Teja fan, or have seen enough of his movies, then you pretty much know what to expect. Good humour, punch dialogues (delivered in his inimitable style) and action-packed storyline had earned him the title "Mass Maharaja", and brought him some of his biggest hits. In Vikram Sirikonda's "Touch Chesi Chudu", Ravi Teja is meaner and leaner than he ever was, but the script lacks any of the attributes that made him a successful star in the first place.  With a shoddy screenplay and an unimaginative storyline, "Touch Chesi Chudu" is a cumbersome watch".

References

External links 
 

2018 films
2010s Telugu-language films
Films featuring songs by Pritam
2018 directorial debut films
Films shot in Hyderabad, India
Indian police films
Indian action films
Fictional portrayals of the Telangana Police
2018 action films
2010s police films